Earring Magic Ken is a model of the Ken doll introduced by Mattel in 1993 as a companion to its Earring Magic Barbie figure, one of six dolls in the Earring Magic Barbie line. This generation of the Ken doll featured an updated look, including blond highlights in his traditionally brown hair, outfits including lavender mesh shirt, purple pleather vest, a necklace with a circular charm and, as the name indicates, an earring in his left ear.

The doll is notable for supposedly being the highest-selling Ken doll in history and for the controversy that ensued upon its debut.

Product and history
Mattel had conducted a survey of girls asking if Ken should be retained as Barbie's boyfriend or whether a new doll should be introduced in that role. Survey results indicated that girls wanted Ken kept but wanted him to look "cooler". The redesigned Ken was the result. Observers quickly noted the resemblance of Earring Magic Ken to a stereotypical gay man, from the pastel-colored clothes to the earring to the necklace, which was described as a "chrome cock ring". Kitsch-minded gay men bought the doll in record numbers, making Earring Magic Ken the best-selling Ken model in Mattel's history.

The doll received news-media press, even making it to the cover of The New York Times Arts and Leisure section. The clothing choices led to speculation that Mattel toy designers had unknowingly taken inspiration for the doll from gay raves in LA or NY.

Despite the commercial success of the doll, a public exposé on the secret meaning of the "circular charm" as a gay sex toy from gay-community commentator Dan Savage in the Seattle, Washington, alternative weekly newspaper The Stranger led Mattel to discontinue Earring Magic Ken and recall the doll from stores.

See also

 Gay Bob
 Billy doll

References

Products introduced in 1993
Barbie
LGBT culture in the United States
Toy controversies